The SportPesa Super Cup is an annual football tournament created and sponsored by bookmakers SportPesa, which pits teams in East Africa against one another in one full week of high class football action.

Overview
The first edition of the SportPesa SuperCup  took place in June, 2017 at the Uhuru Stadium in Dar Es Salaam, Tanzania. The winner inaugural edition, Gor Mahia, played against English Premier League side Everton at the National Stadium in Dar Es Salaam 

The second edition of the regional football tourney pitting East Africa’s finest teams took place on June 3–10, 2018. Eight teams, four from Kenya and four from Tanzania, participated in this year's edition. The winning team will earn a chance to travel to the UK in July for a face-off with English Premier League club, Everton FC at Goodison Park.

The tournament intended to bring about enhanced cohesion within the region as well as showcase only the greatest in East African football talent. As a unique franchise, the Super Cup further served as a uniting initiative between football fans across the region and to some extent the continent as well. It is intended to raise the profile of African football and what it represents – a sense of pride for all who partake in it.

Participants
The teams that participated in the 2018 SportPesa SuperCup edition were:

  - Gor Mahia F.C.
  - AFC Leopards
  - Kariobangi Sharks
  - Kakamega Homeboyz

  - Young Africans S.C.
  - Simba S.C.
  - Singida United F.C.

  - Jeshi la Kujenga Uchumi (JKU)

Matches

Results

Prize money

Winner: $30,000Runner-up: $10,0002nd Runner-Up: $7,500Semi-finalists: $5,000Quarter-finalists: $2,500

References

2018 in African football
2018 in Kenyan football
International association football competitions hosted by Kenya